Ram Dulari Sinha (8 December 1922 – 31 August 1994) was a nationalist, freedom fighter Indian National Congress, Indian parliamentarian, Union Minister, and Governor.

Life

She was Union Minister in Governments headed by Indira Gandhi and Rajiv Gandhi respectively. She became Governor of Kerala on 23 February 1988 to 12 February 1990.

Election results
Assembly Election results

Lok Sabha Election results

See also
List of Governors of Kerala
Gopalganj district, India
Sheohar

References

External links

LssNew/biodata
Eci.nic.in
Eci.nic.in
Eci.nic.in
Eci.nic.in
Eci.nic.in
Eci.nic.in

1922 births
1994 deaths
India MPs 1962–1967
Indian National Congress politicians from Bihar
Governors of Kerala
Women in Bihar politics
People from Sitamarhi district
India MPs 1980–1984
India MPs 1984–1989
Politicians from Patna
Lok Sabha members from Bihar
Women state governors of India
Women in Kerala politics
20th-century Indian women politicians
20th-century Indian politicians